Thomas Heise (born August 22, 1955 in East Berlin), is a German documentary filmmaker.

Life and work
Heise is the son of philosophy professor Wolfgang Heise. He was a printer's apprentice between 1971 and 1973. After a year in the National People's Army, Thomas Heise worked as a director's assistant between 1975 and 1978 in East Germany's DEFA Film Studios, finishing his final exams at night school. In 1978 he studied to be a director at the Konrad Wolf Hochschule für Film und Fernsehen. Following his first film, "Why make a film about these people" (Wozu denn über diese Leute einen Film?), about the culture of East Berlin before the wall came down, he broke off his studies, and began to work as a freelance writer and director. All of his early documentary films were banned or prohibited from screening by the East German government, as well as his radio pieces.

In December 1989, 4 weeks after the fall of the Berlin wall, his radio piece Widerstand und Anpassung - Überlebensstrategie. Erinnerungen eines Mannes an das Lager Dachau (Resistance and Adaptation - Survival Strategies. Memories of a Man of the Dachau Camp) was finally broadcast on Berlin radio.

After the fall of the Berlin wall, Thomas Heise finally became known, creating a number of disputed works, on topics affecting his country, such as the radical right-winged youth movement in Halle. Between 1993 and 1998 he directed a number of theater pieces, until in 2005 his film Mein Bruder. We Will Meet Again premiered at the Berlin International Film Festival in 2005. Heise continues to live and work in Berlin and as a film professor at the Karlsruhe University of Arts and Design since 2007.

In 2019, he created a documentary film entitled Heimat ist ein Raum aus Zeit (Heimat is a Space in Time), that won the main award from Nyon’s reputable «Visions du Réel».

Filmography
 1980: Why Make a Film About These People? (33 min)
 1981: Anka und… [never completed]
 1982: Erfinder 82
 1984: Das Haus (state documentary of the former East German Republic)
 1985: Volkspolizei 1985 (state documentary of the former East German Republic)
 1987: Heiner Müller 1
 1989: 4. November 1989
 1989/90: Imbiß-Spezial
 1989/90: Zuchthaus Brandenburg, Dezember 1989
 1991: Eisenzeit
 1992: STAU - Jetzt geht's los
 1997: Barluschke
 1999/2000: Neustadt (Stau - Der Stand der Dinge)
 2000: Meine Kneipe
 2002: Vaterland
 2004/05: Mein Bruder - We'll Meet Again
 1999/2006: Im Glück (Neger)
 2007: Kinder. Wie die Zeit vergeht
 2009: Material
 2011: Sonnensystem
 2012: Die Lage
 2012: Gegenwart
 2014: Städtebewohner
 2019: Heimat ist ein Raum aus Zeit

Sources

External links

 Official homepage
 Biography
 Biography on kinoreal.at
 
 Stefan Reinecke: taz-Interview with Thomas Heise about his film Mein Bruder - We'll meet again In: Die Tageszeitung, 17.2.2005.

German documentary film directors
Living people
Artists from Berlin
Film directors from Berlin
Members of the Academy of Arts, Berlin
1955 births